Clay Terrace is a community lifestyle center in Carmel, Indiana. Opened in 2004, it is managed by Washington Prime Group.

History
Clay Terrace opened in 2004. It, Jefferson Pointe in Fort Wayne, and Metropolis in Plainfield were the first three lifestyle centers in Indiana. Among the first stores announced for it were Dick's Sporting Goods, Wild Oats Market and DSW. Aeropostale closed January 27, 2015, making the Clay Terrace location the only one in central Indiana to close. Delia's, New York & co., Paradise Bakery, and the Children's Place all closed around the same time.

Wild Oats became Whole Foods
 Old Navy was added in 2007, relocating from Merchants' Square. Circuit City closed in 2008. On June 17, 2014, it was announced that Simon Property Group spinoff Washington Prime had acquired Clay Terrace in addition to six other shopping centers.

References

External links
Clay Terrace

Shopping malls established in 2004
Washington Prime Group
Shopping malls in Indiana
Buildings and structures in Hamilton County, Indiana
Tourist attractions in Hamilton County, Indiana
Lifestyle centers (retail)
Carmel, Indiana